Arkiomaa is a Finnish surname. Notable people with the surname include:

Eetu-Ville Arkiomaa (born 1993), Finnish ice hockey player
Tero Arkiomaa (born 1968), Finnish ice hockey player

Finnish-language surnames